The 57th government of Turkey (28 May 1999 – 18 November 2002) was a coalition government led by  Bülent Ecevit of Democratic Left Party (DSP).

Background 
The number of seats gained by the most successful party in the elections held on 18 April 1999 was only 136 out of 550. Thus, at least three parties had to form the government. Ecevit asked Motherland Party (ANAP) and Nationalist Movement Party (MHP) to participate in the government.

The government
In the list below, the serving period of cabinet members who served only a part of the cabinet's lifespan are shown in the column "Notes". The main reason for the excessive number of changes in the seats was the formation of a new party. A group of MPs split off from DSP to form  the New Turkey Party, and they resigned from their seats in the government. Also, according to the Turkish constitution, some members of the government were replaced by independent members before the elections.

Aftermath
The government ended because of the elections held in 2002.

Notes

References

Cabinets of Turkey
Democratic Left Party (Turkey)
Motherland Party (Turkey)
Nationalist Movement Party
1999 establishments in Turkey
2002 disestablishments in Turkey
Cabinets established in 1999
Cabinets disestablished in 2002
Coalition governments of Turkey
Members of the 57th government of Turkey